Route 597, or Highway 597, may refer to:

Canada
 Alberta Highway 597
  Ontario Highway 597

United Kingdom
  A597 road

United States